Rui Miguel Marinho dos Reis (born 30 January 1984), known as Rui Miguel, is a Portuguese professional footballer who plays for União de Coimbra as a forward.

Club career
Born in Ceira, Coimbra District, Rui Miguel joined Académica de Coimbra's youth ranks at the age of 10, but never really broke into the main squad. He served two loans in the lower leagues and only amassed three first-team appearances, the first coming on 15 April 2006 in the dying stages of the season, at Rio Ave FC: the Students won 4–1, and he scored as a starter.

In the summer of 2008, Rui Miguel moved abroad after signing with Bulgarian club PFC Lokomotiv Mezdra, netting three goals in the first half of the campaign. In January 2009, he changed teams again but stayed in the country, joining PFC CSKA Sofia alongside teammate and compatriot David Silva. He scored his first goals in his second match, netting twice against PFC Lokomotiv Plovdiv for a final 3–1 victory and adding another in his third appearance, against FC Spartak Varna (2–0).

On 16 September 2010, Rui Miguel signed a one-year contract with Kilmarnock, again rejoining former CSKA teammate Silva. He scored his first goal for the side the following 23 October, but in a 1–2 home loss to Inverness Caledonian Thistle.

On 17 June 2011, Rui Miguel returned to Académica which was still in the Primeira Liga, joining on a free transfer and contributing with two appearances as the club won the Taça de Portugal for the first time in 73 years. During summer 2012 he spent time on trial at Oldham Athletic, and was offered a contract; talks eventually stalled over his agent's fee.

In the following four seasons, Rui Miguel competed mostly in the Segunda Liga, representing F.C. Penafiel and Moreirense FC. The exception to this was in 2014–15 when he appeared in eight scoreless matches for the former, who suffered top-division relegation as last.

On 21 June 2016, aged 32, Rui Miguel rejoined Académica for a third stint.

Honours
Académica
Taça de Portugal: 2011–12

Moreirense
LigaPro: 2013–14

References

External links

1984 births
Living people
Portuguese footballers
Association football forwards
Primeira Liga players
Liga Portugal 2 players
Segunda Divisão players
Associação Académica de Coimbra – O.A.F. players
S.C. Pombal players
G.D. Tourizense players
F.C. Penafiel players
Moreirense F.C. players
Gil Vicente F.C. players
G.D. Sourense players
FC Pampilhosa players
C.F. União de Coimbra players
First Professional Football League (Bulgaria) players
PFC Lokomotiv Mezdra players
PFC CSKA Sofia players
Scottish Premier League players
Kilmarnock F.C. players
Portuguese expatriate footballers
Expatriate footballers in Bulgaria
Expatriate footballers in Scotland
Portuguese expatriate sportspeople in Bulgaria
Portuguese expatriate sportspeople in Scotland
Sportspeople from Coimbra District